Low Winter Sun is an American crime drama television series that aired on AMC from August 11 to October 6, 2013, for one season consisting of ten episodes. The series was developed by Chris Mundy and starred Mark Strong and Lennie James. It is based upon the 2006 British two-part miniseries of the same name which also starred Strong in the same role. Filmed and set in Detroit, Michigan, the series follows detectives Frank Agnew and Joe Geddes after they murder a corrupt cop and attempt to cover it up, and explores organized crime in Detroit. The series received generally mixed reviews and AMC announced in December 2013 that it had canceled the series.

Cast

Main cast 
 Mark Strong as Frank Agnew, a Detroit homicide detective who is strait-laced until he believes his girlfriend is brutally murdered
 Lennie James as Joe Geddes, a veteran Detroit homicide detective who appears to operate on both sides of the law
 James Ransone as Damon Callis, a ruthless crime lord destined to be Detroit's reigning mob boss
 Sprague Grayden as Maya Callis, Damon's just-as-ruthless wife, who seeks to expand their drug and prostitution business  
 Athena Karkanis as Dani Kahlil, a Detroit homicide detective hoping to help Frank with his loss, but leery of his actions
 Ruben Santiago-Hudson as Charles Dawson, commander of Frank's precinct, who has survived a lot in his 25 years of service, but this recent corruption scandal could shake him
 David Costabile as Simon Boyd, Detroit police detective and member of Internal Affairs
 Billy Lush as Nick Paflas, a combat veteran looking to be Damon's second-in-command

Recurring cast 
 Alon Moni Aboutboul as Alexander Skelos
 Erika Alexander as Louise "LC" Cullen
 L. Scott Caldwell as Violet Geddes
 Ron Cephas Jones as Reverend Lowdown
 Trevor Long as Sean Foster
 Michael McGrady as Brendan McCann
 Mickey Sumner as Katia
 Ryan Destiny as April Geddes

Production 
In October 2011, AMC began developing the series and ordered a pilot in May 2012, with writer Chris Mundy serving as executive producer and showrunner for the series. In August 2012, it was confirmed that Ernest Dickerson would direct the pilot; filming for the pilot began in September 2012 in Detroit. AMC ordered Low Winter Sun to series in December 2012 with a ten-episode order; the series returned to Detroit to film the remaining nine episodes, for which production began in spring 2013. According to Mundy, the state of Michigan approved $7.5 million in incentives for the series' production. Low Winter Sun was reported to create 245 jobs and spend approximately $26 million in the state.

Casting 
James Ransone and Mark Strong were cast in July 2012, with Ransone playing Damon Callis, a member of the Detroit organized crime syndicate and Strong reprising his role as detective Frank Agnew, which he played in the original British miniseries. Ruben Santiago-Hudson, Athena Karkanis, and Lennie James were cast in August 2012, with Hudson playing Charles Dawson, the commander of Frank’s precinct, Karkanis playing detective Dani Kahlil, and James playing a cop named Joe Geddes. Also in August 2012, Sprague Grayden and David Costabile were cast, with Grayden playing Maya, Damon's wife, and Costabile playing Internal Affairs investigator Simon Boyd. Erika Alexander was cast in September 2012, to play the recurring role of Louise "LC" Cullen, a cop in the precinct.

Episodes

Reception
On the review aggregator website Metacritic, the first season has scored 59 out of 100, based on 27 reviews, indicating "mixed or average reviews".  Rotten Tomatoes gave the first season a 43% rating based on 30 reviews, with the critical consensus "Mark Strong makes for a compelling lead, but Low Winter Sun is too serious for its own good, sagging under the weight of its bleak, brooding tone."

Home media releases
The complete series was released on DVD in region 1 on August 12, 2014, and on Blu-ray and DVD in region 2 on October 28, 2013, and in region 4 on December 4, 2013.

References

External links 
 

2010s American crime drama television series
2010s American police procedural television series
2013 American television series debuts
2013 American television series endings
AMC (TV channel) original programming
English-language television shows
Fictional portrayals of the Detroit Police Department
Serial drama television series
Television series by Endemol
American television series based on British television series
Television shows set in Detroit
Television series by Tiger Aspect Productions
American detective television series